Avi Buffalo (born Avigdor Benyamin Zahner-Isenberg, November 5, 1990) is an American musician, songwriter, and producer.

Career
Avi Buffalo's self-titled debut album was released on April 27, 2010, and was given positive reviews by The A.V. Club, NME, Filter, Drowned in Sound and numerous other music review sites. The album's first single was "What's In It For" with "Jessica" on the B-side. His band performed at SXSW the same year, and opened for Modest Mouse in July. In 2010, the band toured Europe and North America. In June 2011 a second single was released on Sub Pop, "How Come? and Good I'm Wishing", and he had already began writing for a second album.

Avi began recording a follow-up to his self-titled album in 2012, and in 2013 began producing other artists and side projects in addition to his own material. Avi Buffalo's second album At Best Cuckold was released on 8 September 2014 in Europe, and on 9 September in the US.  Avi and a live band toured the US and Europe in support of this album in Autumn of 2014 for a brief amount of time before Avi decided to return to performing, writing and producing new music.

In 2015, he said he was putting an end to the band Avi Buffalo. In 2019, he released the electronic album Glow Cast on Eternal Sound with Ari Prado.

On July 27, 2020, Avi Buffalo was accused of rape by a former bandmate.

Discography

Albums
 2007: Avi Buffalo - Home Recording era begins and varying CD-R bootlegs circulated by Avi Buffalo 
 2010: Avi Buffalo - Avi Buffalo (Sub Pop Records)
 2014: Avi Buffalo - At Best Cuckold (Sub Pop Records)
 2019: Ari Prado & Avi Buffalo - Glow Cast on Eternal Sound (Ari Prado Music)

EPs and singles
 2010: "What's In It For/Jessica" (7" release)
 2011: "How Come/Good I'm Wishing" (7" release)
 2018: "Panegyric"
 2019: "Skeleton Painting"

Other credits
2010: Sevendys - Guitarist
2015: Bobby Rae - The Now and Then Clubhouse (as producer, mixer and masterer)
2015: Litronix - Pump The Gas (as producer, engineer and musician)

References

External links

 

1990 births
Living people
Musicians from California
Sub Pop artists
American alternative rock musicians
Musical groups disestablished in 2015
People from Upland, California